Happer may refer to:

People
 William Happer (born 1939), U.S. physicist, specializing in atomic and atmospheric physics 
 William Murray Happer (born 1972), U.S. pro-wrestler
 Felix Happer, the character played by Burt Lancaster in the 1983 film Local Hero.

Science and technology
 7345 Happer, a Mars-crossing asteroid discovered on July 28, 1992 by Robert H. McNaught at Siding Spring.

See also
 Harper (name)